The name Fernanda has been used for eleven tropical cyclones in the Eastern Pacific Ocean.

 Hurricane Fernanda (1960)
 Hurricane Fernanda (1968)
 Hurricane Fernanda (1972)
 Tropical Storm Fernanda (1976)
 Hurricane Fernanda (1981)
 Tropical Storm Fernanda (1987)
 Hurricane Fernanda (1993) - Threatened Hawaii but headed out to sea
 Tropical Storm Fernanda (1999)
 Hurricane Fernanda (2005)
 Tropical Storm Fernanda (2011)
 Hurricane Fernanda (2017)

Pacific hurricane set index articles